Scenes of Bohemian Life (original French title: Scènes de la vie de bohème) is a work by Henri Murger, published in 1851. Although it is commonly called a novel, it does not follow standard novel form. Rather, it is a collection of loosely related stories, all set in the Latin Quarter of Paris in the 1840s, romanticizing bohemian life in a playful way. Most of the stories were originally published individually in a local literary magazine, Le Corsaire. Many of them were semi-autobiographical, featuring characters based on actual individuals who would have been familiar to some of the magazine's readers.

Original publication
The first of these stories was published in March 1845, carrying the byline "Henri Mu..ez". A second story followed more than a year later, in May 1846. This time Murger signed his name "Henry Murger", spelling his first name with a "y" in imitation of the English name, an affectation he continued for the rest of his career. A third story followed in July, with the subtitle "Scènes de la bohème". The same subtitle was used with 18 more stories, which continued to appear on a semi-regular basis until early 1849 (with a long break in 1848 for the revolution in Paris).

Production

Although the stories were popular within the small literary community, they initially failed to reach a larger audience or generate much income for Murger. This changed in 1849, after Murger was approached by Théodore Barrière, an up-and-coming young playwright, who proposed writing a play based on the stories. Murger agreed to the collaboration, and the result – titled La Vie de la bohème, credited to Barrière and Murger as co-authors – was staged to great success at the Théâtre des Variétés.

The popularity of the play created a demand for publication of the stories. Murger therefore compiled most of the stories into a single collection. To help establish continuity, he added some new material. A preface discussed the meaning of "bohemian", and a new first chapter served to introduce the setting and the main characters. To the end were added two more chapters which wrap up some loose ends and offer final thoughts on the bohemian life. This became the novel, published in January 1851. A second edition was published later in the year, in which Murger added one more story. The late nineteenth century English novelist George Gissing claimed in 1890 to be reading the novel, in French, for the 'twentieth time'.

Adaptations

Two operas were later based on the novel and play, La bohème by Giacomo Puccini in 1896 and La bohème by Ruggero Leoncavallo in 1897. Puccini's became one of the most popular operas of all time, spawning several later works based on the same story.

Works involving the La bohème theme
La bohème – opera by Giacomo Puccini, 1896
La bohème – opera by Ruggero Leoncavallo, 1897
 – zarzuela by Amadeo Vives, 1904
 La Bohème, a 1916 American silent film starring Alice Brady and directed by Albert Capellani
 La Bohème – an MGM silent film starring Lillian Gish and John Gilbert, 1926
 Mimi – British film starring Gertrude Lawrence, 1935
 La Vie de bohème – French film directed by Marcel L'Herbier, 1945
La Bohème – 1965 West German film of Puccini's opera, directed by Franco Zeffirelli
La Vie de Bohème – jazz album by pianist Dave Burrell, 1969
La Vie de bohème – film directed by Aki Kaurismäki, 1992
Rent – musical by Jonathan Larson including the song *"La Vie Bohème", 1996
 Moulin Rouge! – 2001 film by Baz Luhrmann with parts of its plot based on the original story
La Vida Bohème – alternative rock band from Venezuela, founded in 2006

References

External links

 
 
 , uncredited translator.
 

 
1851 French novels
Works originally published in French magazines
Works originally published in literary magazines
Novels set in the 1840s
Novels set in Paris
Novels adapted into operas
French novels adapted into films
Novels based on plays
French novels adapted into plays